Party Rock Mansion is the debut solo studio album by American singer and songwriter Redfoo. It was released on March 18, 2016, through the record labels Rykodisc Records and Party Rock Records. The album was executive produced by Redfoo with additional production by Brandon M. Garcia and Play-N-Skillz, and continues the naming scheme of LMFAO's records Party Rock (2009) and Sorry for Party Rocking (2011). Party Rock Mansion features guest appearances from Stevie Wonder and Dimitri Vegas & Like Mike. It was supported by the singles "New Thang", "Juicy Wiggle" and "Party Train".

Singles 
"New Thang" was released on August 6, 2014, as the first single from the album. The song peaked at number 3 in Australia and New Zealand, also charting in Finland, Greece, Slovakia and South Korea.

The album's second single, "Juicy Wiggle" was released on February 10, 2015. Later that year, Redfoo performed a "Munk Remix" of the song with Alvin and the Chipmunks for the movie Alvin and the Chipmunks: The Road Chip and its soundtrack.

The album's third single, "Party Train" was released February 18, 2016.

Commercial performance 
The album was a commercial failure, with only 144 copies sold throughout Australia in its first week of release.

Track listing

Personnel
Musicians
 Redfoo – vocals, engineer
 Stevie Wonder – featured artist (track 11)
 Dimitri Vegas & Like Mike – featured artist (track 12)

Production
 Brandon M. Garcia – production (track 2, 6, 7, 9, 10, 12), recording engineer
 Play N Skillz – production (track 8, 11)

Charts

References

2016 debut albums
Redfoo albums
Rykodisc albums